Asín tibuok is a rare Filipino artisanal sea salt from the Boholano people made from filtering seawater through ashes. A variant of the salt is also known as túltul  or dúkdok among the Ilonggo people. It is made similarly to asín tibuok but is boiled with gatâ (coconut milk).

Both of them are part of the unique traditional methods of producing sea salt for culinary use among the Visayan people of the central Philippine islands. They differ in taste from salt obtained through traditional drying beds or modern methods. Asín tibuok has a sharp taste with smoky and fruity undertones, while túltul has an innate savory flavor. They are characteristically finely textured with small granules. They are consumed by grating a light dusting over food.

The tradition of making asín tibuok and túltul is nearly extinct due to the difficulty and length of time it takes to manufacture them, the passing of the salt iodization (ASIN) law in 1995, as well as competition with modern imported salts. They are only barely preserved in Bohol, Capiz, and Guimaras. Asín tibuok is listed in the Ark of Taste international catalogue of endangered heritage foods by the Slow Food organization.

Names
Asín tibuok literally means "unbroken salt" or "whole salt" in the Cebuano language of the Boholano people. It is the name of the salt in the island of Bohol.

Similar salt-making traditions also exist in Guimaras island and the neighboring province of Capiz in Panay Island. In Guimaras, it is known as túltul or tul-tul, meaning "lump"; while in Capiz, it is known as dúkdok, meaning "pounded" or "pulverized". Both names are in the Hiligaynon language of the Ilonggo people.

Production
The method of production varies slightly between the Boholano asín tibuok and the Ilonggo túltul or dúkdok. Both methods can only be done for six months of the year, from December to May, due to the fluctuations in seawater salinity during the rainy seasons.

Bohol
Boholano asín tibuok is made by soaking coconut husks for several months in special pits continually filled with seawater during the tides. They are then cut into small pieces and dried for a few days. They are burned in a pile until reduced completely to ash. This takes about a week.  The ash (called gasang) are gathered into a funnel-shaped bamboo filtering device. Seawater is poured into the ash, allowing the water to leach out the salt from the ashes. The brine (known as tasik) is collected into a hollowed out coconut trunk beneath the funnels.

The tasik is poured into special clay pots and hung in walls in a special furnace. These are boiled for a few hours in the furnace, continually replenishing the pots with more tasik once some evaporate. Eventually, the pots will crack, revealing the solidified mass of salt. The salt mass will be initially very hot, and it usually takes a few hours before it is cool enough to be handled. They are sold along with the broken domed pots which has given them the nickname "the dinosaur egg" in international markets due to their appearance.

Guimaras and Capiz
Ilonggo túltul, duldul, or dúkdok is made by gathering driftwood ( or ) and other washed-up plant matter (twigs, reeds, coconut husks, bamboo stems, etc.) from the beach. These are burned completely into ash for about a week. The ash is then gathered into cylindrical woven bamboo containers known as kaing. The kaing are placed on bamboo platforms and a container is placed underneath. Seawater is poured through the ash and caught on these containers. The brine is then strained and transferred into other containers where it is mixed with gatâ (coconut milk). These are poured into molds (hurnohan) and boiled over an outdoor stove (kalan). More of the liquid is continually poured into the molds as they evaporate until nothing but a solid mass of salt remains. These brick-like lumps (known as bareta) are then packaged and sold.

Culinary uses
Asín tibuok and túltul are usually consumed by grating a light dusting of them over food. They were traditionally dusted over plain hot rice with a few drops of oil and eaten as is. They are also used to season sinangag (traditional fried rice). Chunks can also be broken off and dipped into stews and dishes or ground and used like regular table salt.

Conservation
Salt-makers (asinderos) were once important professions in Philippine society, but the craft is nearly extinct in modern times. Part of this is due to the time-consuming traditional methods of producing salt and the hard work that go with it. Artisanal salt-makers can not compete with the cheap imported salt prevalent today in the Philippines. The passage of Republic Act No. 8172, the Act for Salt Iodization Nationwide (ASIN), in 1995 also placed further stress on local salt-makers, forcing many to give up the industry altogether.

Both asín tibuok and túltul are only made by a few families today. They are commonly sold for the tourist trade for their novelty as well as to gourmet restaurants that feature Filipino cuisine. Due to their rarity, they are considerably more expensive than regular salt. The demand is usually high for asín tibuok and túltul, but the supply can not keep up.

Asín tibuok is listed in the Ark of Taste international catalogue of endangered heritage foods by the Slow Food movement.

See also
Salt industry in Las Piñas
List of edible salts

References

Edible salt
Philippine cuisine